V Pay is a Single Euro Payments Area (SEPA) debit card for use in Europe, issued by Visa Europe. It uses the EMV chip and PIN system and may be co-branded with various national debit card schemes such as the German Girocard or Italy's PagoBancomat.

Overview
The V Pay debit card system competes with the Mastercard Maestro debit card product. However, unlike Mastercard Maestro, V Pay cards cannot be used in non-EMV environments, limiting its acceptance to those countries and merchants that use this system. Also unlike Mastercard Maestro, which is issued and accepted globally, V Pay is designed as a specifically European product, and is not issued or accepted outside European countries except for some islands which are part of European countries, such as Saint Martin. However, some cards are co-branded with the Visa Electron system, which allows using them outside Europe.

V Pay cards began to be accepted at merchants in France and Greece in 2005, and acceptance had since expanded to more European countries. 

However from 2019, the V Pay system is gradually phased-out in favor of Visa Debit.

External links 
 Official website

References 
 

Debit cards
Visa Inc.